North Shropshire was a local government district in Shropshire, England from 1974 to 2009. The district council was based at Edinburgh House in Wem. Other settlements included the towns of Ellesmere, Market Drayton, Wem and Whitchurch, as well as the large villages of Shawbury and Baschurch. The district bordered onto Wales, Cheshire and Staffordshire as well as the Shropshire districts of Oswestry, Shrewsbury and Atcham and the unitary Telford and Wrekin.

History
The district was formed on 1 April 1974, under the Local Government Act 1972, by a merger of Market Drayton Rural District and North Shropshire Rural District.

The district and its council were abolished on 1 April 2009, when the new Shropshire Council unitary authority was established, as part of the 2009 structural changes to local government in England.

Settlements
The district council classified Wem, Market Drayton, Whitchurch and Ellesmere as the market towns of North Shropshire, while it gave the classification of "main service villages" to Baschurch, Cheswardine, Clive, Cockshutt, Dudleston Heath, Hadnall, Hinstock, Hodnet, Prees, Shawbury, Tilstock, Welshampton and Woore. The district also included many other smaller villages and hamlets.

Infrastructure
The main roads in the district were the A41, A49 and the A53. There were no motorways.

There were four railway stations in the district: (Yorton, Wem, Prees and Whitchurch), all on the Welsh Marches Line. The Shrewsbury to Chester Line ran through the district as well, but the only station on that section of the line within North Shropshire had been at Baschurch, which had closed in 1965, prior to the district's creation. The Shropshire Union Canal and Ellesmere Canal/Llangollen Canal both ran through the district.

Political control
The first elections to the council were held in 1973, initially operating as a shadow authority until the new arrangements came into effect on 1 April 1974. Political control of the council from 1974 until its abolition in 2009 was held by the following parties:

Leadership
The last leader of the council was David Minnery, a Conservative.

Council elections
1973 North Shropshire District Council election
1976 North Shropshire District Council election (New ward boundaries)
1979 North Shropshire District Council election
1983 North Shropshire District Council election
1987 North Shropshire District Council election
1991 North Shropshire District Council election (District boundary changes took place but the number of seats remained the same)
1995 North Shropshire District Council election
1999 North Shropshire District Council election
2003 North Shropshire District Council election (New ward boundaries)
2007 North Shropshire District Council election

By-election results

See also
North Shropshire constituency - the name of the UK Parliament constituency which covers the former North Shropshire district and also the former Oswestry borough.
Parishes in North Shropshire - the main subdivisions used within the district.

References

District council elections in England
Council elections in Shropshire
Districts of England established in 1974
English districts abolished in 2009
Former non-metropolitan districts of Shropshire